Spartak is a village in Yasynuvata Raion (district) in Donetsk Oblast of eastern Ukraine, at about 20 km NNW from the centre of Donetsk city. Spartak borders from south-west with the Donetsk airfield.

From 1986 until 2003 the village was connected to the city Avdiivka by a tram line.

The War in Donbass, that started in mid-April 2014, has brought along both civilian and military casualties.

Demographics
Native language as of the Ukrainian Census of 2001:
Ukrainian 22.8%
Russian 76.64%

References

External links

 Weather forecast for Spartak

Villages in Donetsk Raion